Ernesto Sota (11 December 1896 – 25 May 1977) was a Mexican footballer who represented his nation at the 1928 Summer Olympics in the Netherlands.

References

1896 births
1977 deaths
Mexican footballers
Association football forwards
Footballers at the 1928 Summer Olympics
Olympic footballers of Mexico
Club América footballers
Mexico international footballers